Le Thoronet is a commune in the Var department in the Provence-Alpes-Côte d'Azur region in southeastern France.

It is known for the romanesque Le Thoronet Abbey, built in the 12th and 13th century.

See also
Communes of the Var department

References

Communes of Var (department)